Yousef Hussain Kamal Al Emadi is a Qatari politician and businessman who served as economy and finance minister from 1998 to 2013.

Education
Al Emadi received a bachelor's degree in business administration from Cairo University.

Career
In 1973, Al Emadi began to work as section chief at the ministry of finance and petroleum. Until November 1996, he was a board member of QatarEnergy. He was also a member of OPEC Fund's governing board.

He served in many key posts, including deputy minister, at the ministry of finance, economy and trade until 1998 when he was appointed minister of finance. He replaced Mohammad bin Khalifa Al Thani in the post. In 2008, his portfolio was expanded as minister of economy and finance.

He was the chairman of various public institutions, including Qatar National Bank, Qatar Steel, RasGas, Qatar Financial Centre Authority and the Doha Securities Market. During his term he also represented the State of Qatar at the International Monetary Fund, the World Bank, Arab Monetary Fund, the Islamic Development Bank and the OPEC Fund.

On 26 June 2013 Kamal was succeeded by Ali Sharif Al Emadi as minister of finance in a cabinet reshuffle. Kamal retained his post as chairman of the Qatar Financial Centre.

Awards
Al Emadi won the prestigious Euromoney Emerging Markets award for Best Finance Minister in the Middle East and North Africa in 2011.

References

External links

Living people
Cairo University alumni
Finance ministers of Qatar
Government ministers of Qatar
Year of birth missing (living people)